In astrology, power signs are associated with extreme power, authority, energy (positive or negative) and a need to control the surroundings. These signs are determined, willful and are more prone to gain power. On the other hand, they can be dictatorial and headstrong.

The three power signs of the Zodiac are:

 Leo: summer in the northern hemisphere and winter in southern hemisphere.
 Scorpio: autumn in the northern hemisphere and spring in southern hemisphere.
 Capricorn: winter in northern hemisphere and summer in southern hemisphere.

References

Western astrological signs